Bell is a rural town and locality in the Western Downs Region, Queensland, Australia.

Geography

Bell is on the Bunya Highway and lies between the agricultural areas of the Darling Downs and the South Burnett with rolling hills of quilt-like patterned farmland. The area's main industry is farming of beef cattle, grain, sheep and pigs.

There are a number of neighbourhoods in the locality:

 Koondai-I 
 Spring Flat()
 Warmga
 Wonga

History

Jarowair (also known as Yarowair, Yarow-wair, Barrunggam, Yarrowair, Yarowwair and Yarrow-weir) is one of the languages of the Toowoomba region. The Jarowair language region includes the landscape within the local government boundaries of the Toowoomba Regional Council, particularly Toowoomba north to Crows Nest and west to Oakey. Giabal is the Southern neighbour in Toowoomba City.

The name Koondai-I  is believed to be the Indigenous name for the area.

The name Wonga may refer to the Wonga windmill.

Originally the area around what is now known as Bell was known at Cattle Creek and was part of a large land holding called Jimbour Station. In the 1870s, the area was opened up for closer settlement and Angus & Christina McPhee from Scotland became the first European settlers nearest to what would become the village of Bell. Over time other families - including Bellingham, Bradley, Edwards, Ensor, McClelland Rush and Walker - settled in the vicinity of Cattle Creek and in 1878 a school was established at Maida Hill to cater for these families. The first use of "Bell" as a town name was in mid-1905 however it was still inter-changeable with Cattle Creek as a description of the general area.

In April 1906, the Bell Branch railway line was opened linking to the Western railway line at Dalby with the following (now-abandoned) stations within the locality:

 Bell railway station
 Koondai-I railway station
 Warmga railway station

With the opening of the railway  was resumed for the township and surveyed into town allotments. The first land sales in Bell were in May 1906. The village was named after Sir Joshua Peter Bell who, at that time, was owner of Jimbour Station.  

Maida Hill Post Office opened on 8 September 1877. It was renamed Bell by 1898, Malakoff in 1907 and closed in 1930. Bell Railway Station Post Office opened by December 1906 and was renamed Bell in 1907.

The Bell Provisional school opened on 4 November 1907 and the Bradley, McPhee and Shaw families feature strongly on the enrolments of 1907. On 1 January 1909, it became Bell State School. The school celebrated its centenary in 2007.

Bell Memorial Public Hall opened in 1917.

The railway continued to operated until 1994.

Bell Library opened in 2013.

Education
Bell State School is a government primary and secondary (Prep-10) school for boys and girls at 90 Dennis Street. In 2018, the school had an enrolment of 88 students with 16 teachers (11 full-time equivalent) and 13 non-teaching staff (8 full-time equivalent).

For education to Year 12, the nearest government school is Dalby State High School in Dalby to the south-west.

Amenities

The Bell Bunya Community Centre at 71 Maxwell Street houses the Bell Library, a branch of Western Downs Libraries.

Bell Memorial Public Hall is at 69 Wallace Street.

Fuel is available from the Bell Store. The main social gathering point in town is at the 'Bellvue' pub while at the Memorial Hall country dances and/or balls are hosted a number of times during each year. The old Freemasons Hall is now home to a cafe.

Other facilities available in Bell include a caravan park, a country hotel (pub), a swimming complex, tennis courts, a lawn bowls club, a 9-hole golf course, horse racing track and police station.

Events 
Bell is known for its traditional country arts and crafts as well as rural-based activities such as horse race meetings, the rural show, rodeo and campdraft competitions. 

The local agricultural show, which celebrated its 50th consecutive year in 2008, is held annually on the first weekend in March. The show features wood chopping, displays of the area's livestock (including milking goats), and working cattle dog 'trials'.

The Bell Races are a popular local event and held on the first Saturday in January every year.

Attractions

The Railway Heritage Parkland, built on the site of the original railway terminus, features an early model diesel locomotive and a vintage passenger carriage as well as a historical mural painted on the shed wall. A number of Bell's early buildings were constructed from locally sourced sandstone - an example is a stone house which was built in 1913.

The Roman Catholic Church hosts a mural painted by local artists showing a history of Salvation.

The Bluebelles Art Gallery at the Bell Bunya Community Centre holds displays of local artists' works.

References

External links

 
 
  Bell & District Web site
 Bell cemetery

Towns in the Darling Downs
Western Downs Region
Localities in Queensland